Piva may refer to:
 Piva (river), a river in Montenegro and Bosnia and Herzegovina
 Piva, Montenegro, a region in Montenegro and tribe
 Piva River, Bougainville, Papua New Guinea
 Piva Trail, Bougainville, Papua New Guinea
 Battle for Piva Trail, 1943
 Piva language, a member of the Piva-Banoni languages 
 Piva (bagpipe), an Italian folk instrument
 Piva (dance), a Renaissance dance
 Lake Piva, a reservoir in Montenegro
 Primrose International Viola Archive, a collection of viola music at Brigham Young University